Howard Eugene Root (13 April 1926 – 19 November 2007) was an American-born British Anglican priest, theologian, and academic. He was Professor of Theology at the University of Southampton from 1966 to 1981, and Director of the Anglican Centre in Rome and Counsellor on Vatican affairs to Archbishop of Canterbury from 1981 to 1991.

Bibliography

References

1926 births
2007 deaths
20th-century American Episcopal priests
20th-century English Anglican priests
Academics of the University of Southampton